Eugène Alphonse Monet de Maubois, called Imbert, known in the world of the song in his time under the pseudonym Eugène Imbert, was a 19th-century French poet, chansonnier, goguettier and historiographer of the goguettes and songs.

Author once known for his books, articles and songs, he is now completely forgotten by the general public.

Some works 
 1866: La Chanson
 1873:  La Goguette et les goguettiers, Étude parisienne, 3rd edition, augmented 6 etched portraits by L. Bryois, in-8, 121 pages.
 1875: Chansons choisies, Élégies parisiennes

External links 
  Eugène Imbert on data.bnf.fr
 Eugène Imbert on Wikisource

19th-century French poets
French chansonniers
French historiographers
Writers from Paris
1821 births
1898 deaths